The Nassau County Courthouse, also known as the Old Nassau County Courthouse and the Historic Nassau County Courthouse,  is a historic two-story red brick courthouse building located at 416 Centre Street in Fernandina Beach, Nassau County, Florida. Designed in the Classical Revival style, it was built in 1891 and features cast-iron Corinthian columns and a massive bell tower and steeple. Meneely and Co. of West Troy, New York, cast the bell for the tower, which was used as a fire alarm for many years.

In 1989, the Nassau County Courthouse was listed in A Guide to Florida's Historic Architecture, published by the University of Florida Press. 

In 2002 the building was carefully restored and renovated by The Auchter Company of Jacksonville. Also in 2002 construction began on a new Judicial Annex at 76347 Veteran's Way in Yulee. It was opened in 2004.

References

External links
 Florida's Historic Courthouses
 

Buildings and structures in Nassau County, Florida
Nassau
Clock towers in Florida
1891 establishments in Florida
Fernandina Beach, Florida
Government buildings completed in 1891